1913 in philosophy

Events 
 Foundation stone of First Goetheanum in Dornach, Switzerland, was laid as a centre for the Anthroposophical Society by Rudolf Steiner (September 20).
 Rabindranath Tagore was awarded the Nobel Prize in Literature.

Publications 
 Edmund Husserl, Ideas: General Introduction to Pure Phenomenology (1913)
 Walther Rathenau, Zur Mechanik des Geistes (1913)
 Rosa Luxemburg, The Accumulation of Capital (1913)
 Max Scheler, Formalism in Ethics and Non-Formal Ethics of Values (1913-16, originally published in German as Der Formalismus in der Ethik und die materiale Wertethik)
 Niels Bohr, "On the Constitution of Atoms and Molecules" (1913)
 Ludwig Wittgenstein, review of Peter Coffey's The Science of Logic (1913)

Births 
 February 27 - Paul Ricœur (died 2005)
 March 3 - Roger Caillois (died 1978)
 September 25 - Norman O. Brown (died 2002)
 November 7 - Albert Camus (died 1960)

Deaths 
 February 22 - Ferdinand de Saussure (born 1857)
 November 7 - Alfred Russel Wallace (born 1823)

References 

Philosophy
20th-century philosophy
Philosophy by year